Overlook, also known as the Burrell Mansion, is a historic home located at Little Falls in Herkimer County, New York.  It was designed by architect Archimedes Russell (1840 - 1915) and built about 1889 for industrialist and inventor David H. Burrell (1841-1919). It is a three-story, asymmetrical masonry building.  It features three full height towers, two rounded with conical roofs and one polygonal.  Also on the property is a contributing carriage house and caretaker's cottage.

It was listed on the National Register of Historic Places in 2009.

References

External links

Houses on the National Register of Historic Places in New York (state)
Houses completed in 1889
Houses in Herkimer County, New York
National Register of Historic Places in Herkimer County, New York